"Alive" is a song recorded by the Black Eyed Peas for their fifth studio album The E.N.D. (2009). It was released on May 23, 2009 as the second promotional single in the campaign "The Countdown to The E.N.D.", the first being "Imma Be" and the third being "Meet Me Halfway", which were later released as commercial singles.

Music and lyrics 
"Alive" is a mid-tempo piano and guitar-driven disco and electro-funk song composed in the key of B minor. will.i.am stated: "Alive is a song about love, is about a relationship, when that person makes you feel renewed, when the person you love makes you feel anything negative in the world matters, "Alive", I'm so proud of the production of this music, pay attention to the layers, textures and elements, I love this song."

Track listing

Credits and personnel
Credits are adapted from the liner notes of The E.N.D.
 apl.de.ap – songwriting, vocals
 Fergie – songwriting, vocals
 Keith Harris – songwriting
 Josh Lopez – guitar
 Caleb Speir – bass
 Taboo – songwriting, vocals
 Ricky Walters – songwriting
 will.i.am – piano, production, songwriting, synthesizer, vocals

Charts

Release history

References

Black Eyed Peas songs
2009 songs
Songs written by will.i.am
Songs written by apl.de.ap
Songs written by Fergie (singer)
Songs written by Taboo (rapper)
Songs written by Keith Harris (record producer)
Songs written by Slick Rick